Joseph Franz Kaiser (11 March 1786 in Graz – 19 September 1859 in Graz) was an army officer, bookbinder, lithographer and publisher from the Styrian region of Austria. His sons Eduard and Alexander were also lithographers.

Life
In 1806 he is recorded as a member of Graz's militia cavalry and when the militia developed into the Landwehr in 1808 he rose to officer rank, becoming an ensign on 29 March 1809. As a member of the 2nd Graz Landwehr-Battalion and commander of its 6th Company, he fought at the battle of Raab under the command of Archduke John of Austria.

1786 births
1859 deaths
Austrian publishers (people)
Bookbinders
Austrian lithographers
Austrian Empire military personnel of the Napoleonic Wars
Businesspeople from Graz
Military personnel from Graz